Edgar Douglas Richmond Bissett (May 3, 1890 – January 14, 1990) was a Liberal-Progressive Member of Parliament in the House of Commons of Canada.

A surgeon by profession, Bissett first ran for federal office in the 1925 federal election as a Liberal candidate in Springfield, Manitoba but was defeated. He ran again in 1926 as a Liberal-Progressive and was successful against Conservative incumbent Thomas Hay and Labour candidate Thomas Dunn. He sat as a backbench supporter of the Liberal government of William Lyon Mackenzie King until he was defeated in the 1930 federal election.

His daughter, Joan Bissett Neiman, was a Liberal Senator from 1972 to 1995.

The mining community of Bissett, Manitoba was named for him.

External links

1890 births
1990 deaths
Canadian surgeons
Liberal-Progressive MPs
Members of the House of Commons of Canada from Manitoba
20th-century surgeons